Ismael Casas Casado (born 7 March 2001) is a Spanish footballer who plays as a right back for Cypriot club AEK Larnaca FC.

Club career
Born in Linares, Jaén, Andalusia, Casas joined Málaga CF's youth setup in July 2013, from CD Almidas Cástulo. He made his senior debut with the reserves on 2 September 2018, starting in a 1–3 away loss against Marbella FC.

Casas finished his first senior season with 27 appearances, as his side suffered relegation. He made his professional debut on 17 August 2019, starting in a 1–0 away win against Racing de Santander.

On 11 July 2020, Casas renewed his contract with Málaga until 2023. On 9 June 2022, he left the club to join compatriot José Luis Oltra at Cypriot club AEK Larnaca FC.

Career statistics

References

External links

2001 births
Living people
People from Linares, Jaén
Sportspeople from the Province of Jaén (Spain)
Spanish footballers
Footballers from Andalusia
Association football defenders
Segunda División players
Segunda División B players
Tercera División players
Atlético Malagueño players
Málaga CF players
AEK Larnaca FC players
Spain youth international footballers